In phonology, syncope (from ) is the loss of one or more sounds from the interior of a word, especially the loss of an unstressed vowel. It is found in both synchronic and diachronic analyses of languages. Its opposite, whereby sounds are added, is epenthesis.

Synchronic analysis 
Synchronic analysis studies linguistic phenomena at one moment of a language's history, usually the present, in contrast to diachronic analysis, which studies a language's states and the patterns of change across a historical timeframe. In modern languages, syncope occurs in inflection, poetry, and informal speech.

Inflections 
In languages such as Irish and Hebrew, the process of inflection can cause syncope:

 In some verbs
  (to play) should become * (I play). However, the addition of the  causes syncope and the second-last syllable vowel  is lost so  becomes .
  (katav), (he) wrote, becomes  (katvu), (they) wrote, when the third-person plural ending  (-u) is added.   
 In some nouns
  (island) should become * in the genitive case. However, instead of *, road signs say,  (the town of the island). Once again, there is the loss of the second .

If the present root form in Irish is the result of diachronic syncope, synchronic syncope for inflection is prevented.

As a poetic device 
Sounds may be removed from the interior of a word as a rhetorical or poetic device: for embellishment or for the sake of the meter.

 Latin  > poetic  ("he had moved")
 English hastening > poetic hast'ning
 English heaven > poetic heav'n
 English over > poetic o'er
 English ever > poetic e'er, often confused with ere ("before")

Informal speech
Various sorts of colloquial reductions might be called "syncope" or "compression".

Contractions in English such as "didn't" or "can't" are typically cases of syncope.

 English Australian > colloquial Strine, pronounced 
 English did not > didn't, pronounced 
 English I would have > I'd've, pronounced 
 English going to > colloquial gonna (generally only when unstressed and when expressing intention rather than direction), pronounced  or, before a vowel, 
 English every pronounced [ˈɛvɹi]

Diachronic analysis 
In historical phonology, the term "syncope" is often limited to the loss of an unstressed vowel, in effect collapsing the syllable that contained it: trisyllabic Latin calidus (stress on first syllable) develops as bisyllabic caldo in several Romance languages.

Loss of any sound 
 Old English  >  > Middle English  > Modern English lord, pronounced 
 English Worcester, pronounced 
 English Gloucester, pronounced 
 English Leicester, pronounced 
 English Towcester, pronounced 
 English Godmanchester, pronounced  (archaic)

Loss of unstressed vowel 
 Latin  > Italian   "hot"
 Latin  > Italian   "eye"
 Proto-Norse  > Old Norse  "arm"
 Proto-Norse  > Old Norse  "books"
 Proto-Germanic  > Old Norse  "heavens"

A syncope rule has been identified in Tonkawa, an extinct American Indian language in which the second vowel of a word was deleted unless it was adjacent to a consonant cluster or a final consonant.

See also 
 Apheresis (linguistics)
 Apocope
 Clipping (morphology)
 Clipping (phonetics)
 Deletion (phonology)
 Elision
 Epenthesis, the addition of sounds to the interior of a word
 Poetic contraction
 Synaeresis
 Synalepha
 Syncopation in music
 Vowel reduction

References

Links 
 
 

Figures of speech
Phonology
Prosody (linguistics)